Wiscombe may refer to:

Tom Wiscombe (b. 1970), architect
Wiscombe Park, a 19th-century Gothic country house in Southleigh, Devon, UK 
Wiscombe Park Hillclimb, a hillclimb, situated in Colyton, Devon, UK.